Joel Chan may refer to:

Joel Chan (actor) (born 1976), Hong Kong actor and singer
Joel Chan (photographer), Singaporean photographer